Noup Head Lighthouse lies on the north west headland of the isle of Westray, in Orkney, Scotland.  It was constructed by David A Stevenson in 1898 for the Northern Lighthouse Board.

The lighthouse became automatic in 1964 and was converted to wind and solar power using a solar array in 2000.

See also

 List of lighthouses in Scotland
 List of Northern Lighthouse Board lighthouses

References

External links

 Northern Lighthouse Board

Lighthouses completed in 1898
Category B listed buildings in Orkney
Category B listed lighthouses
Lighthouses in Orkney
Westray